Lastrup is a municipality in the district of Cloppenburg, in Lower Saxony, Germany. It is situated approximately 15 km southwest of Cloppenburg.

Notable people 
 Ludger Gerdes (1954–2008), painter and sculptor
 Andreas Schnieders (born 1966), boxer
 Özlem Türeci (born 1967), immunologist and businessperson

References

Cloppenburg (district)